Elettra Sincrotrone Trieste is an international research center located in Basovizza on the outskirts of Trieste, Italy.

Elettra – Sincrotrone Trieste S.C.p.A. is a multidisciplinary international research center, specialized in generating high quality synchrotron and free-electron laser light and applying it in materials science. Its mission is to promote cultural, social and economic growth through:
   Basic and applied research
   Technical and scientific training
   Transfer of technology and know-how

The main assets of the research centre are two advanced light sources: the Elettra synchrotron (third generation electron storage ring, working at 2 and 2.4 GeV, in operation since October 1993) and the free-electron laser (FEL) FERMI, continuously (H24) operated supplying light of the selected energy and quality to more than 30 experimental stations on 28 beamlines. Since 1993, Elettra has been subjected to several updated that have allowed a top up operating mode from 2010 for both 2 and 2.4 GeV operational energy.  The accumulation ring is formed by twelve groups of magnets forming a ring of 260 m in circumference. The ring beam current at 2 GeV is normally set to 310 mA and the top-up operational mode foresees a new ring injection every 6 min: 1 mA electron in 4 seconds is injected, keeping the ring current constant in the range of 3‰. At 2.4 GeV the beam current is set to 140 mA, and the top-up injections occurs every 20 minutes: in this case, 1 mA electron in 4 s is injected keeping the current level constant to 7‰. At the actual condition, the spectral brightness available on most beamlines is up to 1019 photons/s/mm2/mrad2/0.1%bw. 

The FERMI FEL work in a SRHG method, operating at 2 GeV and producing coherent femtosecond light pulses with variable polarization, in an ultraviolet energy range. The produced optical pulses are characterized by a High peak power (~ GW) delivered to 8 different beamlines. The peak brightness of the FEL sources is expected to go up to 1030 photons/s/mm2/mrad2/0.1%bw.

These facilities enable the international community of researchers from academy and industry to characterize material properties and functions with sensitivity down to molecular and atomic levels, to pattern and nanofabricate new structures and devices, and to develop new processes. Every year scientists and engineers from more than 50 countries compete by submitting proposals to access and use time on these stations. These are selected by peer-reviewed by panels of international experts on the basis of scientific merit and potential impact, and the winners are granted valuable access time as a contribution to their research. Because of its central location in Europe, Elettra – Sincrotrone Trieste is increasingly attracting users from Central and Eastern European countries, where the demand for synchrotron radiation is in continuous growth, and is part of the primary network for science and technology of the Central European Initiative (CEI). The access by researchers from developing countries has tripled over the last few years, and the Indian research community is one of the largest users. 

Elettra – Sincrotrone Trieste has been the coordinator of the EU-supported networks involving synchrotron and free electron lasers in the European area, in the last decade. Such networks promote transnational access, joint research activities and collaborations among the laboratories to improve the overall service offered to European users.

The facility, available for use by the Italian and international scientific communities, houses several ultra bright light sources, which use the synchrotron and free electron laser (FEL) sources to produce light ranging from ultraviolet to X-rays.

The centre also houses the European Storage Ring FEL Project (EUFELE).

References

See also
 Signorina Elettra is a recurring fictional character in Donna Leon's Commissario Guido Brunetti novels

Synchrotron radiation facilities
Research institutes in Italy
Trieste